Avgustina is an uncommon Russian female first name. Its masculine versions are Avgustin and Avgust. The name is derived from the Latin word augustus, which means majestic, sacred, and was borrowed by Russians from Byzantine Christianity. Its colloquial forms are Avgusta (which can also be a separate, albeit related, name) and Gusta.

The name was included into various, often handwritten, church calendars throughout the 17th–19th centuries, but was omitted from the official Synodal Menologium at the end of the 19th century. In 1924–1930, the name was included into various Soviet calendars, which included the new and often artificially created names promoting the new Soviet realities and encouraging the break with the tradition of using the names in the Synodal Menologia.

Its diminutives include Ava, Avgustinka, Avgusta, Gusta, Gustya, Ustya, Gusya, Gutya, and Tina.

See also
Avguštine

References

Notes

Sources
В. А. Никонов (V. A. Nikonov). "Ищем имя" (Looking for a Name). Изд. "Советская Россия". Москва, 1988. 
Н. А. Петровский (N. A. Petrovsky). "Словарь русских личных имён" (Dictionary of Russian First Names). ООО Издательство "АСТ". Москва, 2005. 
[1] А. В. Суперанская (A. V. Superanskaya). "Современный словарь личных имён: Сравнение. Происхождение. Написание" (Modern Dictionary of First Names: Comparison. Origins. Spelling). Айрис-пресс. Москва, 2005. 
[2] А. В. Суперанская (A. V. Superanskaya). "Словарь русских имён" (Dictionary of Russian Names). Издательство Эксмо. Москва, 2005. 

